This is a list of electoral results for the electoral district of Bancroft in Queensland state elections.

Members for Bancroft

Election results

Elections in the 2020s

Elections in the 2010s

References

Queensland state electoral results by district